Daniel Maichel (14 August 1693 – 20 January 1752) was a German professor of philosophy, theology, logic, physics, rights and politics. He studied protestant theology in Tübingen and earned a master's degree in 1713. Maichel was born in Stuttgart and died in Königsbronn.

He was in touch with Pierre des Maizeaux and visited him in London at the Rainbow Coffee House. He wrote to des Maiseaux "‘in the hope I have that you will still be an illustrious member of that learned Society which meets every evening at the Rainbow Café".

References
 Döring, Heinrich: Die gelehrten Theologen Deutschlands im achtzehnten und neunzehnten Jahrhundert: Band J-M. J. K. G. Wagner, 1832, Seite 401-402. In German.

Academic staff of the University of Tübingen
1693 births
1752 deaths
German philosophers
18th-century philosophers
People from Stuttgart
18th-century German male writers